XHUP-FM is a radio station on 96.3 FM in Tizimín, Yucatán. It is owned by Cadena RASA and carries its Candela grupera format.

History
XEUP-AM 1420, a 250-watt station, received its concession on January 18, 1962. It promptly raised its power to 500 watts daytime. The 1980s saw XEUP move to 1310 with 1,000 watts daytime, and XEUP finished its AM years on 790 kHz with 2.5 kW day and 1 kW night.

XEUP moved to FM in 2010.

References

Radio stations in Yucatán
Radio stations established in 1962